Sofie Holmboe Dahl (born 1 November 1996) is a Danish badminton player. She won her first title at the 2015 Norwegian International Series tournament in the women's singles event.

Achievements

BWF International Challenge/Series 
Women's singles

  BWF International Challenge tournament
  BWF International Series tournament
  BWF Future Series tournament

References

External links 
 

1996 births
Living people
Danish female badminton players
21st-century Danish women